Fighting Back is a 1917 American silent Western film directed by Raymond Wells and starring William Desmond, Claire McDowell and Jack Richardson.

Cast
 William Desmond as The Weakling
 Claire McDowell as The Fury
 Jack Richardson as China-Mex
 Curley Baldwin as Alama Sam
 Pete Morrison as Mournful Pete
 William Ellingford as James Newton
 Tom Guise as Col. Hampton 
 Thornton Edwards as Tony
 Josie Sedgwick as Dance-Hall Girl

References

Bibliography
 Rainey, Buck. Sweethearts of the Sage: Biographies and Filmographies of 258 actresses appearing in Western movies. McFarland & Company, 1992.

External links
 

1917 films
1917 Western (genre) films
1910s English-language films
American black-and-white films
Triangle Film Corporation films
Films directed by Raymond Wells
Silent American Western (genre) films
1910s American films